The 2007 Moscow Victory Parade was a celebration of the 62nd anniversary of the defeat of Nazi Germany in the Great Patriotic War. It was the last time Vladimir Putin made a holiday address in his first term as president. The parade was commanded by the head of the Moscow Garrison General of the army Vladimir Bakin, and reviewing the parade was Minister of Defence Anatoliy Serdyukov .Music was performed by the Moscow Garrison's Central Orchestra under Major General Valery Khalilov.

This was the first parade that was watched by people online outside of Russia.

Parade Program 
Note: Those indicated in bold indicate first parade appearance, those indicated with italic indicate double or multiple parade appearances.

 Colonel General Vladimir Bakin, Commander of the Moscow Military District (parade commander)
 Defense Minister of the Russian Federation Anatoliy Serdyukov (parade inspector)

Military Bands in Attendance 
 Massed Military Bands of the Military Band Service of the Armed Forces of Russia led and conducted by Major General Valery Khalilov and composed of:
 Headquarters Band of the Moscow Military District
 Central Military Band of the MDRF
 Band of the Moscow Military Conservatoire, Military University of the Ministry of Defense of the Russian Federation
 Corps of Drums of the Moscow Military Music College

Infantry Column 
 154th Moscow Garrison Commandant's Honor Guard Regiment and Color Guards
 Colors Party composed of:
 Flag of Russia
 Victory Banner
 Banner of the Armed Forces of the Russian Federation
 Combined Honor Guard Company of the Armed Forces
 Historical units
 Infantry
 Airmen
 Sailors
 Representative units of the Armed Forced, Ministry of Internal Affairs, Ministry of Emergency Situations and Civil Defense, Federal Security Service as well as units of the Moscow Military District
 Combined Arms Academy of the Armed Forces of the Russian Federation
 Peter the Great Military Academy of the Strategic Missile Forces
 Military University of the Ministry of Defense of the Russian Federation
 Gagarin Air Force Academy
 Zhukovsky Air Force Engineering Academy
 Civil Defense Academy of the Ministry of Emergency Situations of the Russian Federation
 Military Technological University
 Moscow Military Space Institute of Radio Electronics
 Moscow Border Guards Institute of the Border Guard Service of the Federal Security Service of the Russian Federation "Moscow City Council"
 2nd Guards Motor Rifle Division
 4th Kantemir Guards Armored Brigade "Yuri Andropov"
 27th Sevastopol Guards Motor Rifle Brigade
 Ryazan Airborne Command Academy "Gen. of the Army Vasily Margelov"
 331st Guards Airborne Regiment
 ODON Ind. Motorized Internal Troops Division of the Ministry of Internal Affairs of the Russian Federation "Felix Dzerzhinsky"
 336th Separate Bialystok Guards Naval Infantry Brigade of the Baltic Fleet
 Nakhimov Naval School
 Suvorov Military School
 Moscow Military Commanders Training School "Supreme Soviet of the RSFSR/Russian Federation"

Training for the parade took place from March to April in the Alabino, Moscow Oblast.

Music 
The music and marches were played by the Military Band of the Armed Forces of Russia under the direction of Major General Valery Khalilov

 Inspection and Address
 March of the Preobrazhensky Regiment (Марш Преображенского Полка)
 Slow March of the Tankmen (Встречный Марш Танкистов) by Semyon Tchernetsky
 Slow March to Carry the War Flag (Встречный Марш для выноса Боевого Знамени) by Dmitriy Valentinovich Kadeyev
 Slow March of the Guards of the Navy (Гвардейский Встречный Марш Военно-Морского Флота) by Nikolai Pavlocich Ivanov-Radkevich
 Slow March of the Officers Schools (Встречный Марш офицерских училищ) by Semyon Tchernetsky
 Slow March (Встречный Марш) by Dmitry Pertsev
 Slow March of the Red Army (Встречный Марш Красной Армии) by Semyon Tchernetsky
 Slow March (Встречный Марш) by Evgeny Aksyonov
 Glory (Славься) by Mikhail Glinka
 Parade Fanfare All Listen! (Парадная Фанфара «Слушайте все!») by Andrei Golovin
 State Anthem of the Russian Federation (Государственный Гимн Российской Федерации) by Alexander Alexandrov
 Signal Retreat (Сигнал "Отбой")

 Infantry Column
 March General Miloradovich (Марш "Генерал Милорадович") by Valery Khalilov
 Farewell of Slavianka (Прощание Славянки) by Vasiliy Agapkin
 Ballad of a Soldier (Баллада о Солдате) by Vasily Pavlovich Solovyov-Sedoy
 Lefort's March (Лефортовский Марш) by Valery Khalilov
 Artillery March (Марш Артиллеристов) by Tikhon Khrennikov
 On Guard for the Peace (На страже Мира) by Boris Alexandrovich Diev
 Air March (Авиамарш) by Yuliy Abramovich Khait
 We are the Army of the People (Мы Армия Народа) by Georgy Viktorovich Mavsesya
 March of the Cosmonauts/Friends, I believe (Марш Космонавтов /Я верю, друзья) by Oskar Borisovich Feltsman
 March Kant (Марш «Кант») by Valery Khalilov
 In Defense of the Homeland (В защиту Родины) by Viktor Sergeyevich Runov
 Combat March (Строевой Марш) by Dmitry Illarionovich Pertsev
 We Need One Victory (Нам Нужна Одна Победа) by Bulat Shalvovich Okudzhava
 Glory to the Heroes (Слава героям) by Dmitry Illarionovich Pertsev
 Crew is One Family (Экипаж - одна семья) by Viktor Vasilyevich Pleshak
 On the Road (В Путь) by Vasily Pavlovich Solovyov-Sedoy
 Victory Day (День Победы) by David Fyodorovich Tukhmanov

 Drill Show and Conclusion
 Potpourri of
Invincible and Legendary (Фрагмент Несокрушимая и легендарная) by Alexander Alexandrov
March of the Preobrazhensky Regiment (Марш Преображенского Полка)
March Hero (Марш "Герой")
Borodino (Бородино)
 Unknown drum piece
 Procession of the Nobles from Mlada by Nikolai Rimsky-Korsakov
 Song of the Russian Army (Песня о Российской Армии) by Alexandr Alexandrov

References

External links 
 Parade Footage, on Youtube

Moscow Victory Day Parades
2007 in Russia
May 2007 sports events in Europe
2007 in Moscow